En busca del paraíso may refer to:
 En busca del paraíso (1968 TV series), a Mexican telenovela
 En busca del paraíso (1982 TV series), a Mexican telenovela